Vannaröd Castle is an estate at Hässleholm Municipality in Scania,  Sweden.
The manor house was built in  Tudor style during 1890 by Gustaf Christian Edvard Barnekow (1837-1916) and his wife Agnes Sofia Montgomery (1848-1936).  
Barnekow had it built  as a copy of his wife's ancestral  home in Scotland. Vannaröd  has been owned by Sösdalaortens Bygdegårdsföreningen since 1953. The main building is currently leased out to a restaurant operation.

See also
List of castles in Sweden

References

External links
Sösdalaortens Bygdegårdsförening website

 Buildings and structures in Skåne County